The Tour de Limpopo is a multi-day road cycling race that has been held annually in South Africa since 2018. It is part of UCI Africa Tour as a 2.2 event.

Winners

References

Cycle races in South Africa
2018 establishments in South Africa
Recurring sporting events established in 2018
UCI Africa Tour races